The Thunderbird Country Club is an 18-hole golf course designed by Lawrence Hughes in Rancho Mirage in California's Coachella Valley.  It has hosted the Ryder Cup and the Palm Springs Golf Classic (now known as the American Express).  Opened in 1951, the country club has been a favorite of many celebrities including Bing Crosby and Bob Hope as well as US Presidents Gerald Ford and Barack Obama First known as the Thunderbird Ranch, it was purchased by Johnny Dawson who established Coachella Valley's first 18-hole golf course here in 1951.

The golf cart is rumored to have been invented at Thunderbird Country Club. Ford Thunderbird is named for the club.

Lawrence Hughes also designed the Tomahawk Lake Country Club in South Dakota, which is listed on the National Register of Historic Places.

Membership discrimination 
In 1957, Lucille Ball and Desi Arnaz bought a nearby home and hoped to join the elite Thunderbird Country Club, but the club prohibited minorities and Jewish people. Arnaz was denied admission to the Thunderbird Country Club because he was Cuban. In response to this prejudice, Arnaz bought property in nearby Indian Wells, California and opened the Indian Wells Resort Hotel, which did not discriminate against minorities and Jewish people. At one point, Jewish comedian Jack Benny was not permitted to join the club. 

In 1977, Gerald Ford's purchase of property at nearby Thunderbird Heights reawakened local interest in discrimination. A Jewish community leader reported that there was no evidence of discriminatory practices in Palms Springs, but "that does not mean that Jewish people are welcome everywhere."

References

External links

Golf clubs and courses in California
Ryder Cup venues
Rancho Mirage, California
Sports venues in Riverside County, California